The 2020 TK Sparta Prague Open was a professional tennis tournament played on outdoor clay courts. It was part of the 2020 WTA 125K series. It took place in Prague, Czech Republic between 29 August – 6 September 2020.

The tournament draw size was increased from 32 to 128 (and hence, the prize money and ranking points offered increased, as well). This was done to allow players unable to participate in the US Open qualifying to compete, which was cancelled due to the ongoing COVID-19 pandemic. along with the last minute cancellation of a concurrent tournament in Austria.  Due to the overwhelming size of participants, the event scheduled to be held only on TK Sparta Praha had to have make use also of nearby I. Czech Lawn Tennis Club on the Stvanice Island.

WTA singles main-draw entrants

Seeds

1 Rankings are as of 17 August 2020.

Other entrants
The following players received wildcards into the singles main draw:

  Nikola Bartůňková
  Sára Bejlek
  Linda Fruhvirtová
  Lucie Havlíčková
  Kristýna Lavičková
  Linda Nosková
  Barbora Palicová
  Darja Viďmanová

The following players received entry into the singles main draw using a protected ranking:
  Başak Eraydın
  Miriam Kolodziejová
  Sabine Lisicki
  Daria Lopatetska

The following players received entry as an alternate:
  Ivana Popovic

Withdrawals
  Naiktha Bains → replaced by  Eugenie Bouchard
  Verónica Cepede Royg → replaced by  Lina Gjorcheska
  Alexa Glatch → replaced by  Mirjam Björklund
  Anhelina Kalinina → replaced by  Panna Udvardy
  Marta Kostyuk → replaced by  Amanda Carreras
  Claire Liu → replaced by  Andrea Lázaro García
  Jesika Malečková → replaced by  Ivana Popovic
  Mandy Minella → replaced by  Irene Burillo Escorihuela
  Ellen Perez → replaced by  Ana Sofía Sánchez
  Kamilla Rakhimova → replaced by  Riya Bhatia
  Arina Rodionova → replaced by  Maryna Zanevska
  Storm Sanders → replaced by  Francesca Jones 
  Yanina Wickmayer → replaced by  Katie Volynets

WTA doubles main-draw entrants

Seeds 

 1 Rankings as of 17 August 2020

Champions

Singles

  Kristína Kučová def.  Elisabetta Cocciaretto 6–4, 6–3

Doubles

  Lidziya Marozava /  Andreea Mitu def.  Giulia Gatto-Monticone /  Nadia Podoroska 6–4, 6–4

References

2020 WTA 125K series
2020 in Czech tennis